Live Rust is a live album by Neil Young and Crazy Horse, recorded during their fall 1978  Rust Never Sleeps  tour.

Live Rust composed of performances recorded at several venues, including the Cow Palace near San Francisco. Young also directed a companion film, Rust Never Sleeps, under a pseudonym "Bernard Shakey", which consisted of footage from the Cow Palace.

The CD version of the album was slightly edited so as to fit on a single compact disc, which were limited to 74 minutes at the time this album was first issued on CD. In 2014, a remastered, high-resolution download was made available on the Pono store, restoring the album to its original length.

Between tracks 2 and 3 on side 2 there is a stage announcement calling for people to get off of a tower and comments on an ongoing rainstorm.  This is actually taken from Woodstock, almost a decade prior where Young performed as a member of Crosby, Stills, Nash & Young.

Track listing
Adapted from original LP labels. All tracks written by Neil Young, unless noted.Crazy Horse appears on all tracks, except side one and track 3 of side two.

Personnel
Neil Young - lead guitar, harmonica, piano, lead vocals
Crazy Horse
Frank Sampedro - guitar, keyboards, vocals
Billy Talbot - bass, vocals
Ralph Molina - drums, vocals

Charts
Album

Singles

Year End Chart

Certifications

Notes

Albums produced by David Briggs (producer)
Neil Young live albums
1979 live albums
Reprise Records live albums
Crazy Horse (band) albums